Wuda is a genus of ichneumon wasps in the subfamily Cryptinae, tribe Cryptini and subtribe Ceratocryptina. Species have an Oriental distribution.

References

External links
 

 
 Wuda at insectoid.info

Cryptinae
Ichneumonidae genera